Maoricrypta youngi is a species of small sea snail or slipper snail, a marine gastropod mollusc in the family Calyptraeidae. It is known to occur in North Island, New Zealand.

References

 Powell A. W. B., William Collins Publishers Ltd, Auckland 1979 

Calyptraeidae
Gastropods of New Zealand
Gastropods described in 1940